No. 5 Group was a Royal Air Force bomber group of the Second World War, led during the latter part (February 1943 – 1945) by AVM Sir Ralph Cochrane.

History

Overview

The Group was formed on 1 September 1937, with its headquarters at RAF Mildenhall, in Suffolk. In October the same year, the group headquarters (HQ) was moved to St Vincents Hall in Grantham, Lincolnshire. During the Second World War, 5 Group was concentrated primarily in south Lincolnshire (whereas 1 Group was more concentrated in the north of the county). Most of the 5 Group airfields were around Lincoln, including RAF Scampton.

By the end of the Second World War, the Group had grown to 15 squadrons. During the war, it included a significant proportion of Royal Australian Air Force (or Australian-born RAF) personnel, both aircrews and ground staff, who were concentrated in three "Article XV squadrons": No. 455 Squadron RAAF, No. 463 Squadron RAAF and No. 467 Squadron RAAF. The Group also famously included an elite, multi-national unit: No. 617 Squadron, perhaps better known as "The Dambusters". 617 Sqn was formed in March 1943, and comprised RAF, RAAF, RCAF/Canadian and RNZAF/New Zealand aircrew personnel, who had been hand-picked from squadrons throughout Bomber Command.

Led by 617 Squadron, the Group often engaged in special missions, using new weapons, such as Barnes Wallis's bouncing bombs, and two type of "earthquake bomb": Tallboy and Grand Slam.

1939 – 1945

From 11 September 1939 until 22 November 1940, Air Vice Marshal (AVM) Arthur Harris was in charge. The group started the war with 10 squadrons,  all equipped with the Handley Page Hampden. The Group continued to fly only Hampdens until the northern winter of 1940–1941 when it began to convert to the new Avro Manchester.

Early in 1942, the Manchester, was replaced by its four-engined variant: the Avro Lancaster, started to equip the group squadrons. On 17 October 1942, under Operation Robinson, some 86 Lancasters from 5 Group (without fighter escort) flew deep into occupied France to attack the Schneider armaments works at Le Creusot and the associated electrical station at Montchanin. On the night of 22–23 October, 85 Lancasters of the Group attacked Genoa without a single loss. On 24 October, 74 Lancasters delivered a daylight attack on Milan.

In May 1943, 617 Squadron breached two of the Ruhr dams during the famous "Dams Raid": Operation Chastise.

AVM Ralph Cochrane, who was to become influential in terms of Bomber Command tactics, took command of 5 Group in October 1943. Group HQ was moved to Morton Hall, at RAF Swinderby in November 1943,

Using the Stabilizing Automatic Bomb Sight (SABS) and the  Tallboy, 617 Sqn achieved a bombing error of only  at the V Weapon launch site at Abbeville, during December 1943.

During the lead-up to D-day, Cochrane was an advocate of low-level marking, to improve accuracy, and lobbied heavily to be allowed to prove the principle operationally. New systems of target-marking were developed as result and were tested by 617 Squadron – especially its commanding officer, Wing Commander Leonard Cheshire, using the de Havilland Mosquito and North American Mustang. (Cheshire was subsequently awarded the Victoria Cross and taken off active operations.)

The special missions included attacks on the German battleship Tirpitz in late 1944 and the use of the Grand Slam against the strategically-important Bielefeld railway viaduct, in March 1945.

5 Group was disbanded on 15 December 1945.

Notable raids
 First "thousand-bomber attack" on Cologne on 30 May 1942 (shared)
 "Dambuster" attack on the dams at the Möhne Reservoir, the Edersee and Sorpedam on 17 May 1943 (without backup)
 Operation Bellicose, the first ‘shuttle raid’ of the war, against rocket facilities near Lake Constance and shipping at La Spezia Naval Base via Tunisia, in June 1943.
 Operation Hydra against the Peenemünde Army Research Center on 17 August 1943
 Attack on Königsberg, 29 August 1944
 Attack on Braunschweig, 15 October 1944 (without backup)
 Attack on Heilbronn, 4 December 1944 (without backup)
 Attack on Dresden on 13 February 1945 (without backup on the first attack)
 Grand Slam attack on Schildesche viaduct near Bielefeld on 14 March 1945 (without backup)
 Attack on Würzburg, 16 March 1945 (shared)
 Attack on the oil refinery at Tønsberg in Southern Norway, the last raid by heavy bombers of Bomber Command in World War II.

Commanders
1918 to 1919
 1 April 1918 Lieutenant Colonel Frederick Halahan
 May 1918 Brigadier-General Charles Laverock Lambe

1937 to 1945
 17 August 1937 Air Commodore William Bertram Callaway
 11 September 1939 Air Vice-Marshal Arthur Travers Harris
 22 November 1940 Air Vice-Marshal Norman Bottomley
 12 May 1941 Air Vice-Marshal John Slessor
 25 April 1942 Air Vice-Marshal Alec Coryton
 28 February 1943 Air Vice-Marshal Ralph Cochrane
 16 January 1945 Air Vice-Marshal Hugh Constantine

See also
 List of Royal Air Force groups

References

Citations

Bibliography

External links
 RAF History.
 Air of Authority – A History of RAF Organisation – Group No's 1 – 9

005
005
Military units and formations disestablished in 1945
Bomber aircraft units and formations of the Royal Air Force